The 54th British Academy Film Awards, given by the British Academy of Film and Television Arts, took place on 25 February 2001 and honoured the best films of 2000.

Ridley Scott's Gladiator won Best Film, while Ang Lee won Best Director for Crouching Tiger, Hidden Dragon. Billy Elliot was voted Outstanding British Film of 2000; the film's lead actor, Jamie Bell, won Best Actor in a Leading Role. In addition, Julia Roberts won Best Actress in a Leading Role for her role in Erin Brockovich, Benicio del Toro won Best Actor in a Supporting Role for Traffic, and Julie Walters won Best Actress in a Supporting Role for Billy Elliot.

Winners and nominees

Statistics

See also
 73rd Academy Awards
 26th César Awards
 6th Critics' Choice Awards
 53rd Directors Guild of America Awards
 14th European Film Awards
 58th Golden Globe Awards
 12th Golden Laurel Awards
 21st Golden Raspberry Awards
 15th Goya Awards
 5th Golden Satellite Awards
 16th Independent Spirit Awards
 6th Lumières Awards
 27th Saturn Awards
 7th Screen Actors Guild Awards
 53rd Writers Guild of America Awards

References
 2001 Awards at IMDb
 Gladiator conquers the Baftas at BBC
 Film in 2001  BAFTA Awards at BAFTA
 Gladiator wins BAFTA's Best Film at CNN
 Gladiator, Tiger in Tie at BAFTA noms ABC news at ABC News
 Gladiator, Crouching Tiger do battle in Bafta nominations at The Guardian

Film054
British Academy Film Awards
British Academy Film Awards
February 2001 events in the United Kingdom
2001 in London
2000 awards in the United Kingdom